Empis lindneri is a species of fly in the family Empididae. It is included in the subgenus Coptophlebia of the genus Empis. It is found in the  Afrotropic.

References

Empis
Asilomorph flies of Europe
Insects described in 1967